Olga Danilović (born 23 January 2001) is a Serbian tennis player.

In July 2018, Danilović won her first WTA Tour singles title in Moscow by beating Anastasia Potapova in the final. She also won two WTA doubles titles, first in Tashkent and the second one in Lausanne. On the WTA Challenger Tour, she has won one doubles title. She has also won five singles titles and one doubles title on the ITF Women's Circuit. On 8 October 2018, she reached her best singles ranking of world No. 96. On 6 February 2023, she peaked at No. 107 in the WTA doubles rankings.

In 2018, Danilović's coach became former world No. 2, Àlex Corretja, having been her mentor since 2016. During her title tour in Moscow, former Serbian Fed Cup captain, Dejan Vraneš, traveled with Danilović and coached her although he is not her official coach. In 2018-19, she was briefly coached by Petar Popović. In 2017–18, her coach was Juan Lizariturry. Danilović was coached in the past by Denis Bejtulahi (in 2017) and Tatjana Ječmenica (in two stints – before late 2015 and in 2016).

Playing for Serbia Fed Cup team, Danilović has a win–loss record of 8–6 in Fed Cup competition.

Personal life
Olga's father is Serbian former basketball player Predrag Danilović, while her mother, Svetlana (née Radošević), is a sports reporter for Radio Television of Serbia.

Tennis career

Junior years
As a junior, Danilović posted a win–loss record of 93–33 in singles and 72–24 in doubles, and reached No. 5 in the combined junior world rankings in January 2018.

She won three Junior Grand Slam doubles titles (each on a different surface) with three different partners – 2016 French Open with Paula Arias Manjón, 2017 Wimbledon with Kaja Juvan and 2017 US Open with Marta Kostyuk.

Junior Grand Slam results - Singles:
 Australian Open: 3R (2017)
 French Open: 2R (2016)
 Wimbledon: 3R (2016)
 US Open: QF (2017)

Junior Grand Slam results - Doubles:
 Australian Open: 2R (2017)
 French Open: W (2016)
 Wimbledon: W (2017)
 US Open: W (2017)

2018: Top 100, first WTA titles; Fed Cup Heart Award
Danilović made her Fed Cup debut in February 2018 in Group I of Fed Cup Europe/Africa Zone, winning all three singles matches, including a 6–2, 6–4 win over world No. 15, Anastasija Sevastova, in the promotional play-offs. The courageous performances for the national team earned Danilović a Fed Cup Heart Award and a cheque of $1,000 to be donated to a charity, which she chose to donate to University Children's Hospital in Belgrade.

In March, she won her first $25k title in Santa Margherita di Pula. In May, she was given a qualifying wildcard for the Premier Mandatory tournament in Madrid, where she beat the former top 30 player Kateryna Bondarenko in the first round, but lost to Aryna Sabalenka in the final round of qualifying. In mid-July, Danilović won the first $60k title in her career when she came back from one set down to beat another former top 30 player, Laura Siegemund, 5–7, 6–1, 6–3, in the final of Versmold. She also reached the final in doubles of the same tournament with compatriot Nina Stojanović.

In late July, she won her first career WTA Tour singles title in Moscow, defeating Anastasia Potapova in the final, in three sets. Danilović became the first player born in the third millennium (after 2000) to win a WTA tournament singles title. She also became the second lucky loser in the history of the WTA Tour to win the title. This was the first WTA tournament final between two players under 18 since Tatiana Golovin and Nicole Vaidišová played in the final of the 2005 Japan Open.

She participated in the US Open qualifying, where she beat Bianca Andreescu, before losing to Jaimee Fourlis. She then entered the Tashkent Open, where she beat Anna Kalinskaya in the first round, before losing to Anastasia Potapova in a Moscow re-match. In the same tournament, she won the doubles title partnering Tamara Zidanšek.

On 1 October 2018, Danilović entered the top 100 for the first time when she reached a singles ranking of 97. The following week, she reached her highest ranking of the season, No. 96.

In mid-October, she lost in the first round of qualifying in Linz and Luxembourg. She next participated in the WTA 125 Mumbai Open, where she was seeded fourth and lost to Danka Kovinić in the first round, whom she also partnered with to reach the semifinals in doubles. This proved to be her last tournament of the year as she withdrew from the following week's WTA 125 Open de Limoges.

2021: Australian Open and US Open debut
Along with Francesca Jones, Danilović made her Grand Slam main draw debut at the Australian Open. She won in the first round of the tournament where she faced Petra Martic. She was defeated in the second round by Shelby Rogers, in straight sets. In July, she made two back-to-back quarterfinals. First, at the Budapest Grand Prix, she won first two rounds before losing to Dalma Gálfi in the quarterfinal. The following week, at the Palermo Ladies Open, she lost to Zhang Shuai in the same round.

2022: French Open debut
At the French Open, she qualified for the main draw to make her debut at this major defeating Viktoriya Tomova.

Ranked No. 124 as a qualifier at the Ladies Open Lausanne, she reached her second career final by beating Misaki Doi in the first, Anna Kalinskaya in the second, home favorite Simona Waltert in the quarterfinals and Anastasia Potapova in the semifinals. In the final, she was beaten by Petra Martić. At the same tournament, she won the doubles event, partnering Kristina Mladenovic.

Performance timelines

Only main-draw results in WTA Tour, Grand Slam tournaments, Fed Cup/Billie Jean King Cup and Olympic Games are included in win–loss records.

Singles
Current after the 2023 Indian Wells Open.

Doubles
Current through the 2023 WTA Lyon Open.

WTA career finals

Singles: 2 (1 title, 1 runner-up)

Doubles: 4 (2 titles, 2 runner-ups)

WTA Challenger finals

Doubles: 2 (1 title, 1 runner-up)

ITF Circuit finals

Singles: 8 (5 titles, 3 runner–ups)

Doubles: 4 (1 title, 3 runner–ups)

Junior Grand Slam tournament finals

Girls' doubles: 3 (3 titles)

Fed Cup/Billie Jean King Cup participations

Singles (6–2)

Doubles (2–4)

Head-to-head records

Record against top-10 players
Danilović's record against players who have been ranked in the top 10. Active players are in boldface.

Record against No. 11–20 players
Danilović's record against players who have been ranked world No. 11–20. Active players are in boldface:

  Kaia Kanepi 
  Petra Martić 
  Anastasija Sevastova 
  Sabine Lisicki 
  Veronika Kudermetova 
  Kirsten Flipkens 
  Leylah Fernandez 
  Beatriz Haddad Maia 0–1

Wins over top 10 players

Award
 2018 – Fed Cup Heart Award (Europe/Africa Zone Group I)

Notes

References

External links
 
 
 

2001 births
Living people
Serbian female tennis players
Tennis players from Belgrade
French Open junior champions
Wimbledon junior champions
US Open (tennis) junior champions
Grand Slam (tennis) champions in girls' doubles